This is a list of all known Roman sites within the county of Lincolnshire.

Settlements

Other

References

 
Roman
Lincolnshire sites